Flandre Air (IATA: IX, ICAO: FRS) was a French regional airline headquartered at Lille Airport and in Lesquin, France, near Lille.

History
The airline began as a charter airline in 1977. It began scheduled services in 1985. In October 1997 Flandre Air became the European launch customer of the Embraer RJ-135. In November 1998 Flandre Air signed a franchise agreement with Air Liberté, which began in January 1999. In October 1999 Proteus Airlines acquired Flandre Air. On 30 March 2001 Flandre, Proteus, and Regional Airlines merged into Régional, which itself merged into HOP! in 2013.

Fleet
 13 – Beech 1900
 9 – Embraer Brasilia
 1 – Beech King Air

References

Defunct airlines of France
Airlines established in 1977
Airlines disestablished in 2001